"Oriental Diamond/Kuchibiru Motion" is a single from Puffy AmiYumi.

Kazuya Yoshii, the writer of "Kuchibiru Motion", recorded a cover of the song for his 2009 single "Biru Mania".

Track listing
1. オリエンタル・ダイヤモンド (Oriental Diamond)
2. くちびるモーション (Kuchibiru Motion)
3. ねじポーション (Neji Potion)

Chart performance
The single peaked at number 55 on the singles chart and stayed on the chart for 2 weeks.

References

2007 singles
Puffy AmiYumi songs

pt:Oriental Diamond